This is a list of members of the South Australian Legislative Council from 1897 to 1900.

This was the fifth Legislative Council to be affected by the amendments to the Constitution in 1881, which provided for the Colony to be divided into four districts: (1) Central; (2) Southern; (3) North-Eastern and (4) Northern, with six members in each division; one third of each to be replaced in rotation every three years. (Previously, the whole colony acted as one electoral district "The Province" with one third replaced at General Elections every four years.)

References
Parliament of South Australia — Statistical Record of the Legislature

Members of South Australian parliaments by term
19th-century Australian politicians